"Writing on the Wall" is a song by Moroccan-American rapper French Montana featuring American rapper and singer Post Malone, American rapper Cardi B, and Jamaican producer Rvssian. It was released as the fifth single from French Montana's third studio album, Montana (2019), on September 27, 2019. It is also part of the official soundtrack for the 2019 Need for Speed: Heat

Background
French Montana first announced in an April 2019 Beats 1 interview with Zane Lowe that his album was "96% done" and he had a song with Post Malone and Cardi B. Montana further discussed the track in a May 2019 interview with Entertainment Weekly.

Promotion
French Montana posted a montage of clips from the video on his social media accounts on September 26, announcing that the song would be released the following day.

Awards and nominations

Charts

Certifications

Release history

References

2019 singles
2019 songs
French Montana songs
Post Malone songs
Cardi B songs
Songs written by French Montana
Songs written by Post Malone
Songs written by Cardi B
Songs written by Louis Bell
Song recordings produced by Louis Bell

Reggae songs
Epic Records singles